Holyoke Credit Union is a non-profit financial co-operative chartered by the Commonwealth of Massachusetts, and headquartered in Holyoke, Massachusetts. Established on September 7, 1911, the credit union was originally known as Notre Dame du Perpetuel Secours Credit Union of Holyoke and was open to the public, but strongly encouraged membership amongst school children of Holyoke's French-Canadian parochial schools at the time. On December 27, 1918, the name was changed to the present one, and today is open to anyone living or working in the Hampden and Hampshire counties of Massachusetts.

Holyoke Credit Union is a member of the National Credit Union Administration (NCUA) and the SUM ATM network.

References

External links
 Annual Audited Financial Statements, Holyoke Credit Union

1911 establishments in Massachusetts
Companies based in Holyoke, Massachusetts
Credit unions based in Massachusetts
French-Canadian culture in Massachusetts